Pentidotea is a genus of isopods in the family Idoteidae. There are about 13 described species in Pentidotea.

Species
These 13 species belong to the genus Pentidotea:

 Pentidotea aculeata Stafford, 1913
 Pentidotea australis Hale, 1924
 Pentidotea gracillima (Dana, 1854)
 Pentidotea kirchanskii (M. A. Miller & Lee, 1970)
 Pentidotea montereyensis (Maloney, 1933)
 Pentidotea panousei Daguerre de Hureaux, 1968
 Pentidotea recta Rafi & Laubitz, 1990
 Pentidotea resecata (Stimpson, 1857) (eelgrass isopod)
 Pentidotea rotundata H. Richardson, 1909
 Pentidotea schmitti (Menzies, 1950)
 Pentidotea stenops (J. E. Benedict, 1898)
 Pentidotea whitei (Stimpson, 1864)
 Pentidotea wosnesenskii (Brandt, 1851) (rockweed isopod)

References

Further reading

External links

 

Valvifera
Articles created by Qbugbot